Josef Erber (birth name: Josef Houstek) (16 October 1897 in Ottendorf — 1987) was an SS-Oberscharführer at Auschwitz concentration camp. He was in charge of the crematoria.

Erber is mentioned several times in the account of Sonderkommando member Filip Müller, and is noted to have been among the most notoriously cruel of the SS personnel.

After serving at Auschwitz, in 1944, Josef Houstek changed his name to Josef Erber.

References
 

Auschwitz concentration camp personnel
SS non-commissioned officers
Austro-Hungarian military personnel of World War I
People from Opava District
1897 births
1987 deaths
Silesian-German people
Waffen-SS personnel